Kerstin Lillemor Ekman, née Hjorth, (born 27 August 1933) is a Swedish novelist.

Life and career 
Kerstin Ekman wrote a string of successful detective novels (among others De tre små mästarna and Dödsklockan) but later went on to psychological and social themes. Among her later works is Mörker och blåbärsris (1972) (set in northern Sweden) and Händelser vid vatten (1993), in which she returned to the form of the detective novel.

Ekman was elected member of the Swedish Academy in 1978, but left the Academy in 1989, together with Lars Gyllensten and Werner Aspenström, due to the debate following death threats posed to Salman Rushdie. In 2018, the Academy granted her resignation, the rules of membership having changed to allow members to resign.

In 1998, she was awarded the Litteris et Artibus medal.

Partial bibliography 
See the article on Swedish Wikipedia for a complete bibliography.

 Blackwater (Händelser vid vatten, 1993), translated by Joan Tate, 1996
 Under the Snow (De tre små mästarna, 1961), translated by Joan Tate, 1997
 The Forest of Hours (Rövarna i Skuleskogen, 1988), translated 1998
 Grand final i skojarbranschen (2011)
 Då var allt levande och lustigt : om Clas Bjerkander : Linnélärjunge, präst och naturforskare i Västergötland (2015)

The Women and the Town (Kvinnorna och staden) Tetralogy 
 Witches' Rings (Häxringarna, 1974), translated by Linda Schenck, 1997
 The Spring (Springkällan, 1976), translated by Linda Schenck, 1999
 Angel House (Änglahuset, 1979), translated by Sarah G. Death, 2002
 A City of Light (En stad av ljus, 1983), translated by Linda Schenck, 2003

The Wolfskin (Vargskinnet) Trilogy 
 God's Mercy (Guds Barmhärtighet, 1999)
 The Last String (Sista rompan, 2002)
 Lottery Scratchcards (Skraplotter, 2003)

References 

2009-11-21 Nationalencyklopedin • http://www.ne.se/kerstin-ekman

External links 
Kerstin Ekman: Be careful of writers. Interview with Kerstin Ekman recorded during the Louisiana Literature festival, 2012. Video by Louisiana Channel.

1933 births
Living people
People from Finspång Municipality
Swedish women writers
Members of the Swedish Academy
Uppsala University alumni
Selma Lagerlöf Prize winners
Nordic Council Literature Prize winners
Litteris et Artibus recipients
August Prize winners
Swedish women novelists
Women mystery writers
Moa Award recipients
Swedish mystery writers